Sheikh Abdurahman Sh. Nuur was a Somali Sheikh (religious leader), qādi (judge) of the government at that time and the inventor of the Borama script for the Somali language.

Biography
Sheikh Abdurahman Sh. Nuur was born in Gabiley and grew up in Borama and was of the royal lineage, the Reer Ugaas subclan of the Makayl-Dheere branch of the Gadabuursi Dir clan. Growing up he was a Qur'anic teacher in the British Somaliland protectorate. His father Sheikh Nur was a well-known and notable figure and was a qādi for many years. He was a learned or knowledgeable man, in particular when it came to the history of his own clan, the Gadabuursi. Sheikh 'Abdurahman would later follow in his father's footsteps by also becoming a qādi, albeit of the entire northern British Somaliland region.

In 1933, Sheikh Nuur devised a quite phonetically accurate new orthography for transcribing the Somali language. While the script enjoyed considerable currency in his home region, the Sheikh harbored no illusions as to its widespread adoption, writing in a publication of his wherein he employed the script itself that "I publish it here with no intention of attempting to contribute to the already abundant confusion in the choice of a standard orthography for Somali".

See also
 Gadabuursi script
 Osmanya script
 Kaddare script
 Somali alphabet
 Wadaad's writing
 Osman Yusuf Kenadid
 Shire Jama Ahmed
 Hussein Sheikh Ahmed Kaddare

Notes

References
David D. Laitin, Politics, language, and thought: the Somali experience, (University of Chicago Press: 1977)

External links
 Osmanya, Borama, Wadaad's writing and the Somali language
 The Gadabuursi Somali Script - qasidas in Gadabuursi/Borama

Ethnic Somali people
Creators of writing systems
Gadabuursi
People from Maroodi Jeex
People from Awdal